Deglycyrrhizinated licorice an herbal supplement typically used in the treatment of gastric and duodenal ulcers. It is made from licorice from which the glycyrrhizin has been removed.

Research
Glycyrrhizin is known to cause negative side effects, such as hypertension and edema; removing the glycyrrhizin is meant to avoid these symptoms.

According to MedlinePlus and the Natural Medicines Comprehensive Database, licorice is "possibly effective" for dyspepsia in combination with other herbs, but there is "insufficient evidence" to rate its effectiveness for other conditions.

Regarding stomach ulcers, specifically, there is "some evidence...that specially prepared licorice will speed the healing of stomach ulcers".

Footnotes

Dietary supplements